Dicentra formosa (western, wild or Pacific bleeding heart) is a flowering plant with fern-like leaves and an inflorescence of drooping pink, purple, yellow or cream flowers native to the Pacific Coast of North America.

Description
Pacific bleeding-heart is a perennial herbaceous plant. Its leaves are three to four times divided and fern-like, growing from a brittle rhizome at the base of the plant.

The flowers are pink, red, or white and heart-shaped and bloom in clusters of 5 to 15 at the top of leafless, fleshy stems above the leaves from mid-spring to autumn, with peak flowering in spring. The four petals are attached at the base. The two outer petals form a pouch at the base and curve outwards at the tips. The two inner petals are perpendicular to the outer petals and connected at the tip. There are two tiny, pointed sepals behind the petals. Seeds are borne in plump, pointed pods. The plant self-seeds readily. It frequently goes dormant for the summer after flowering, emerging and flowering again in autumn.

The species contains isoquinoline, a toxic alkaloid known to be fatal to cattle.

The Pacific bleeding-heart is frequently confused with the fringed bleeding-heart (Dicentra eximia) and sold under that name. The fringed bleeding-heart has narrower flowers and longer, more curved outer petal tips. D. formosa is related to Lamprocapnos spectabilis, another popular plant called "bleeding heart", which was formerly placed in the same genus.

Ecology
The Pacific bleeding-heart is native to moist woodland, forest, and streambanks from California to British Columbia, from sea level to the subalpine zone.

There are two subspecies, Dicentra formosa subsp. formosa and Dicentra formosa subsp. oregona. Subsp. formosa grows in the majority of the plant's range, from Vancouver Island and southern British Columbia and south through Washington and Oregon to central California in the Coast Ranges and Cascades, and on the western slope of the Sierra Nevada. Subsp. oregana grows in a small area of southern Oregon and northern California in serpentine soils in the Siskiyou Mountains. These subspecies are also distinguished by appearance:
 Dicentra formosa subsp. formosa – leaves glaucous beneath and never glaucous above, flowers purple pink to pink or white
 Dicentra formosa subsp. oregona (often spelled oregana) – leaves glaucous above and beneath, flowers cream or pale yellow

Cultivars

Dicentra formosa is widely grown as a garden plant, and several cultivars have been developed. Those marked  have gained the Royal Horticultural Society's Award of Garden Merit:
white and green flowers
'Langtrees' (= 'Pearl Drops') – bluish-green leaves
'Margaret Fish' – bluish-gray-green
'Quicksilver' – bluish-gray-green – resentful of hot, humid climates and sun
'Snowflakes' (= 'Fusd') – green
'Sweetheart' – green
pink and red flowers
'Bacchanal'  – deep red flowers
'Coldham' – deep burgundy
'Luxuriant'  – red flowers
'Zestful' – deep rose-pink

There are several hybrid cultivars involving D. formosa, the eastern American species D. eximia and the Japanese species D. peregrina:
'Adrian Bloom' (from a seedling of D. 'Bountiful') – dark pink flowers, bluish-green leaves
'Aurora' (D. formosa × D. eximia) – pure white, gray-green – particularly tolerant of hot-humid climates
'Bountiful' (D. formosa subsp. oregana × D. eximia) – rosy red, bluish-green
'Gothenburg' (D. formosa subsp. oregana × D. peregrina f. alba) – light pink, compact
'King of Hearts' – D. peregrina × (D. formosa subsp. oregana × D. eximia) – pink, bluish-gray-green
'Silversmith' (D. formosa subsp. oregana × D. eximia) – white pink-tinted, green
'Stuart Boothman'  (D. formosa subsp. oregana × D. eximia) – deep pink, gray-green

History
The Pacific bleeding-heart (Dicentra formosa subsp. formosa) was first noted by Europeans when the Scottish surgeon and naturalist Archibald Menzies encountered it on the Vancouver Expedition. Menzies collected seed in 1792 in Nootka Sound, and gave it to the Royal Botanic Gardens at Kew in 1795. From there, seed made its way into cultivation in Europe. It apparently was not cultivated in the United States until 1835, when William Kenrick began selling the plant in Boston. The subspecies oregana was first cultivated around 1932, when it was offered by Borsch and Sons in Oregon, but is not grown very often.

References

External links

Jepson Manual Treatment
map: Dicentra formosa subsp. formosa – Dicentra formosa subsp. ''oregana
CalPhotos (UC Berkeley photo gallery)
King County Native Plant Guide

formosa
Flora of California
Flora of British Columbia
Flora of Washington (state)
Flora of Oregon
Natural history of the California Coast Ranges
Garden plants of North America
Plants described in 1842
Flora without expected TNC conservation status
Taxa named by Henry Cranke Andrews